A special election was held in  on August 28, 1797 to fill a vacancy created by the resignation of Jeremiah Smith (F) on July 26 of the same year.  Smith had been appointed United States Attorney for the District of New Hampshire.

Election results
New Hampshire electoral law required a majority for election.  As no candidate won a majority on the first ballot, a run-off election was held October 30, 1797

See also
List of special elections to the United States House of Representatives

References

New Hampshire at-large
New Hampshire 1797 at-large
1797
New Hampshire at-large
1797 New Hampshire elections
United States House of Representatives 1797 at-large